Sex trafficking in Brunei is human trafficking for the purpose of sexual exploitation and slavery that occurs in the country.

Brunei citizens, primarily women and girls, have been sex trafficked within the country and to other countries in Asia. Foreign victims are sex trafficked into the country. Children, persons in poverty, and migrants are particularly vulnerable to sex trafficking. Victims are deceived, threatened, and or forced into prostitution. They suffer from physically and psychologically trauma and are typically guarded and or locked up in poor conditions. A number contract sexually transmitted diseases from rapes. Victims’ family members are also threatened so that the authorities are not alerted.

Male and female traffickers Brunei come from all social and economic classes. Traffickers are often members of or facilitated by crime syndicates and gangs. Some perpetrators are the victims’ family members.

The government of Brunei has been criticized for its inadequate anti-sex trafficking initiatives. Some officials have been complicit in sex trafficking.

Anti-sex trafficking organizations

YAS Brunei, a Bruneian youth initiative that is a product of Young Southeast Asian Leaders Initiative, fights sex trafficking in the country.

References

 

Child sexual abuse
Crime in Brunei
Forced prostitution
Forced marriage
Organized crime activity
Law enforcement in Brunei
Sex industry
Brunei
Crimes against women
Women's rights in Brunei